Maixent Poitevin (a.k.a. Maixent de La Bidollière), was a 16th Century French squire and jurist. 

Barrister and alderman (avocat and ) of Poitiers in Poitou, France since September 9, 1559, he eventually became mayor of the town in 1564. He served two one-year terms. 

But he had gone down in history for his role as the town's  when it was besieged in 1569 during the French Wars of Religion - his idea of overflowing the Clain allowed Catholics to keep the city under control. 

La Bidollière, died after 1595, was brother of the poet .

Citations

Sources
 
 
 

People from Poitiers
16th-century French people